Lisa Sanditz is an American painter who received the Guggenheim Fellowship in 2008 and the Anonymous Was A Woman award in 2015. She is a visiting assistant professor of studio arts at Bard College. Her works are in the permanent collections of the Columbus Art Museum, The Fogg Art Museum, the Dallas Museum of Art, and the Kemper Museum of Contemporary Art in Kansas City.

Background 
Sanditz received a B.A. in studio art from Macalester College in 1995 and then worked at the Precita Eyes Mural Arts Center in San Francisco before returning to study at the Brooklyn Pratt Institute. She earned her M.F.A. in painting there in 2001.

Group shows 
Her group shows include those at the CRG Gallery in New York City, the Galleria Glance in Torino, Italy, the ACME Gallery in Los Angeles and the Shanghai Art Fair.

Solo exhibits 
Her first solo show was called "Season's Tickets" at CRG in New York City and took place in 2003. Other solo shows include "Best Buy" at the Rodolphe Janssen Gallery in Brussels, "Fly Over" at the Kemper Museum and others. In 2020,. her solo exhibit "Mud Season" was featured at the Huxley-Parlour Gallery in London, England.

References 

20th-century American painters
American women painters
Macalester College alumni
Year of birth missing (living people)
Living people
21st-century American women
Pratt Institute alumni
21st-century American painters